Below is a list of Mayors of the City of Miami, Florida, United States.

List of mayors

See also
Government of the City of Miami
 
 Timeline of Miami
 List of mayors of Miami-Dade County, Florida, 1964–present
 Miami City Hall

References

Bibliography
  
  (About voter fraud)

External links
 City of Miami. City Officials

Miami
 
Miami-related lists